Szymon Andrzej Szynkowski vel Sęk (born 24 November 1982 in Poznań) is a Polish politician who currently serves as a member of Sejm and Secretary of State at the Ministry of Foreign Affairs.

Early life and education 
Szynkowski vel Sęk graduated from the Adam Mickiewicz University in Poznań with a degree in international relations (2006). Between 2003 and 2004, he was studying at Osnabrück University. 

From 2006 to 2015, Szynkowski vel Sęk served as city councillor in Poznań. He has been the founder and president (2012–2016) of Project Poznań, a local think-tank. In 2015–2016, he was Poznań's delegate to the Board of the Association of Polish Cities.

From 2004 to 2015, Szynkowski vel Sęk was assistant of Jacek Tomczak, Marcin Libicki, Konrad Szymański, Ryszard Czarnecki, members of the European Parliament.

Political career 
In 2015 Szynkowski vel Sęk was elected member of the Polish Sejm. He sits on the Sejm's European Union and Foreign Affairs Committees, and chaired the Polish-German Parliamentary Group.

On 1 June 2018 Szynkowski vel Sęk was appointed Secretary of State for the Polish Community Abroad, European Policy and Public Diplomacy at the Ministry of Foreign Affairs.

In October 2021, Szynkowski vel Sęk – on behalf of the Polish government – summoned Belgium's ambassador to express "disapproval and indignation" after Belgian Prime Minister Alexander De Croo accused Poland of "playing with fire" in a worsening dispute with the European Commission over the rule of law.

References 

1982 births
Adam Mickiewicz University in Poznań alumni
Law and Justice politicians
Living people
Government ministers of Poland
Politicians from Poznań
Members of the Polish Sejm 2015–2019
Members of the Polish Sejm 2019–2023
Polish city councillors